Sabse Bada Rupaiya is a Hindi language comedy opera that aired on SAB TV channel in 2005. The series was produced by popular Indian television producer Gautam Adhikari.

Cast
Navneet Nishan as wife of elder son
Harsh Chhaya as elder son
 Aliraza Namdar as younger son
Asawari Joshi as Kiran (wife of younger son)
Preeta Jain as maid of the royal house
Anand Abhyankar as father
Madhuri Sanjeev as Mother
Manish Jain as multiple character
Shahnawaj Khan as servant 
Abha Parmar as multiple character 
Tanveer Alam as multiple character
 Nafis Ahmad as Minister

Crew
Sunil Salgia - Director
Tanveer Alam, Manish Jain and Manjit Singh- Associate Director
Amit Sharma - Executive Producer
 Story, Screenplay & Dialogue: Tauqueer Alam, Nadeem Abbasi, Arvind Jagtap & Sunil Salgia

Episodic Theme
Monday & Tuesday 10 PM

References
 http://entertainment.oneindia.in/television/news/2006/chhaya-evil-070306.html

2005 Indian television series debuts
2005 Indian television series endings
Indian television soap operas
Sony SAB original programming